Neolygus is a genus of plant bugs in the family Miridae. There are at least 110 described species in Neolygus.

See also
 List of Neolygus species

References

Further reading

External links

 

Mirini